2015 Yokohama FC season.

Matches Played
The team played in 42 matches.

League Position
The team finished in 15th place in the league.

J2 League Results

References

External links
 J.League official site

Yokohama FC
Yokohama FC seasons